WOCE FM 101.9 ("Radio Que Buena", literally "Radio How Good") is a radio station serving the Chattanooga metropolitan area radio market, and having the suburb of Ringgold, Georgia as its city of license.

It serves Chattanooga and most of Cleveland, Tennessee as well as Dalton, Georgia, in southeast Tennessee and northwest Georgia.  The station transmits from just south of the state line on the large ridge known as White Oak Mountain, north-northeast of Ringgold and south-southeast of East Brainerd.

History
WSGC-FM was an oldies station known as "Majic" that signed on March 1, 1989, by longtime Chattanooga TN radio disc jockey Tommy Jett. It was Chattanooga's first FM oldies station. It was later owned by Clear Channel Communications.

During the WSGC-FM period, Chattanooga broadcaster and Tennessee Radio Hall of Fame inductee, Career Class of 2023, Johnny Eagle served as General Manager from 1991 to 1993. 

Later, as WTUN, the station played classic country music.  Clear Channel agreed to sell the station to Whitfield Communications in January, 2006. On January 1, 2006, Classic Country "The Legend" moved to WNGA 97.3/99.3 and WTUN then started simulcasting with WNOO.  After a few months of simulcasting with WNOO, WTUN 101.9 then changed its broadcast callsign to WOCE and is now a Spanish-language broadcaster.

References

External links

OCE
OCE